Carabus italicus is a species of beetle from family Carabidae, found in Italy, Slovenia, and Switzerland.

Subspecies
The species have only 2 subspecies which could only be found in Italy and Switzerland:
Carabus italicus italicus Dejean, 1826 Italy, Switzerland
Carabus italicus rostagnoi Luigioni, 1904 Italy

References

italicus
Beetles described in 1826
Beetles of Europe